Cristian Gil may refer to:

Cristian Gil (footballer, born 1979), Colombian football forward, full name Cristian Ali Gil Mosquera
Cristian Gil (footballer, born 1996), football forward, son of Cristian Ali Gil Mosquera